The following is a list of the 23 cantons of the Gard department, in France, following the French canton reorganisation which came into effect in March 2015:

 Aigues-Mortes
 Alès-1
 Alès-2
 Alès-3
 Bagnols-sur-Cèze
 Beaucaire
 Calvisson
 La Grand-Combe
 Marguerittes
 Nîmes-1
 Nîmes-2
 Nîmes-3
 Nîmes-4
 Pont-Saint-Esprit
 Quissac
 Redessan
 Roquemaure
 Rousson
 Saint-Gilles
 Uzès
 Vauvert
 Le Vigan
 Villeneuve-lès-Avignon

References